The 1994 Tour de Hongrie was the 23rd edition of the Tour de Hongrie cycle race and was held from 25 July to 1 August 1994. The race started and finished in Budapest. The race was won by Wolfgang Kotzmann.

Route

General classification

See also

 1994 in sports

References

1994
Tour de Hongrie
Tour de Hongrie
July 1994 sports events in Europe
August 1994 sports events in Europe